Jesús Membrado Giner (27 January 1949, Bordón, Spain) is a Spanish politician for the Spanish Socialist Workers' Party (PSOE).

Married with one daughter, Membrado gained a degree in History and Geography and subsequently worked as a school teacher. In 1993, he became Secretary General of the Aragon regional branch of the Unión General de Trabajadores a major Spanish Trade Union historically linked to the PSOE. He held that position until 2004.

He entered politics in 2004 when he was elected to the Spanish national parliament as a deputy for Zaragoza province. He was re-elected in 2008 and headed the PSOE list on both occasions.

References

External links
Interview in El Periodico de Aragon
Membrado's blog

1949 births
Living people
People from the Province of Teruel
Members of the 8th Congress of Deputies (Spain)
Members of the 9th Congress of Deputies (Spain)
Spanish Socialist Workers' Party politicians